Anne M. Coughlin is the Lewis F. Powell Jr., Professor of Law at the University of Virginia School of Law.

Early life and education
Coughlin graduated from Tufts University with a B.A. in English in 1978. She then completed her M.A. in English at Columbia University in 1979 before entering law school. She earned her J.D. at New York University School of Law, graduating in 1984. At NYU, Coughlin served as managing editor of the New York University Law Review.

Career
After law school, Coughlin clerked for Judge Jon O. Newman of the United States Court of Appeals for the Second Circuit and then for Justice Lewis F. Powell of the Supreme Court of the United States.

Coughlin began her academic career at Vanderbilt Law School, teaching there from 1991 to 1995. She joined the faculty at the University of Virginia in 1996, after having served as a visiting professor during the 1995-96 academic year. Coughlin's research focuses on criminal law and procedure and feminist jurisprudence. She is the coauthor of a widely used casebook for first year criminal law courses. She is also the author of a prominent law review article on battered woman syndrome.

Coughlin is notable outside of academia for her leading role in a lawsuit against the Pentagon's policy excluding women from combat roles. Some commentators have credited this lawsuit with influencing the Department of Defense's 2013 decision to reverse this policy.

See also
 List of law clerks of the Supreme Court of the United States (Seat 1)

Publications
.
.
.
.

References

External links
 Faculty Site at University of Virginia
 Appearances on C-Span

Living people
Year of birth missing (living people)
Columbia Graduate School of Arts and Sciences alumni
Tufts University School of Arts and Sciences alumni
New York University School of Law alumni
Vanderbilt University Law School faculty
University of Virginia School of Law faculty
Law clerks of the Supreme Court of the United States
American scholars of constitutional law
20th-century American lawyers
21st-century American lawyers
American legal scholars
American women legal scholars
American women academics
21st-century American women